Methods of Mayhem is the 1999 debut album by American rock band Methods of Mayhem. It was Tommy Lee's first album since leaving Mötley Crüe earlier that year. The album was certified Gold by the RIAA and received generally positive reviews from critics.

Background
Former Mötley Crüe drummer Tommy Lee's new musical venture, Methods of Mayhem, arose from his collaboration with rapper TiLo. Sparked by pent-up frustration resulting from jail stints, run-ins with the law, and tabloid reporters, Lee pulled together numerous stars from the worlds of rock and hip-hop.

Additional personnel include: George Clinton, Kid Rock, Lil' Kim, The Crystal Method, Snoop Dogg, Fred Durst and Mix Master Mike.

It is an enhanced audio CD which contains regular audio tracks and multimedia computer files. The album booklet "ill-ustrations" features the artwork of Derek Hess.

"Get Naked" and "New Skin" were released as singles for the album.

The supporting tour for the album featured Stephen Perkins (Jane's Addiction) on drums.

"Crash" was featured in the video games Gran Turismo 3: A-Spec and Crazy Taxi 2 (both which were edited to censor profanity), along with the riff to "Who The Hell Cares", as well as being in the theatrical trailer for the film Driven.

"Hypocritical" was featured in the video game Dave Mirra Freestyle BMX 2 and the game Motor Mayhem.

Critical reception
Entertainment Weekly (1/7/2000, p. 68) – "Most of this rap-metal is surprisingly legit – and cameos by Lil' Kim, Fred Durst, and Kid Rock don't hurt." – Rating: B−
Q magazine (4/2000, p. 96) – 3 stars out of 5 – "...big, thumping, sweary, contemporary noise. Lee is entirely serious; he has the group's name tattooed on his arse cheeks..."
Alternative Press (3/2000, p .86) – 4 out of 5 – "...armed to the teeth with special guests, hopping between metal-edged techno and radio-minded hard rock. The surprise: It ain't bad, and a few of these tunes are 'really good'..."
CMJ (12/27/1999, p. 5) – "...brass-knuckled, rhythmically dense, rap-rock....owing more to pop-industrial music and Bomb Squad production than it does to Fred Durst....one of 1999's grittiest, most heartfelt rap-rock albums..."
Vibe (2/2000, p. 160) – "...combines heavy guitar riffs with insolent B-boy wordplay....As an exercise in funky head-banging, MAYHEM isn't half bad....producer, Scott Humphrey manages to mix up [Tommy] Lee's limited palette just enough to keep you tuned in..."
NME (2/14/2000, p. 41) – 6 out of 10 – "...contains more than enough of the mysterious kick-ass factor....successfully [mixing] hip-hop beats with some exceedingly heavy guitar riffing..."

Track listing

Personnel
Tommy Lee – vocals, guitar, drums, percussion
TiLo – vocals
Kai Marcus – guitar
Phil X – guitar
Danny Lohner – guitar
Ken Andrews – guitar
Scott Phaff – guitar 
Randy Jackson – bass
Chris Chaney – bass
Audrey Wiechman – bass

Additional musicians
Snoop Dogg – vocals on "Who the Hell Cares"
Kid Rock – vocals on "New Skin"
Fred Durst – vocals on "Get Naked"
Lil' Kim – vocals on "Get Naked"
George Clinton – vocals on "Get Naked"
Mix Master Mike – turntables on "Get Naked"
U-God – vocals on "Mr. Onsomeothershits"
Scott Kirkland – keyboards on "Narcotic" and "Spun"
F.I.L.T.H.E.E. Immigrants – vocals on "Proposition Fuck You"

Charts

References

1999 debut albums
Methods of Mayhem albums
Albums produced by Scott Humphrey
MCA Records albums